Aleksandr Nikolayevich Marochkin (born 14 July 1990) is a Kazakhstani professional footballer who plays for FC Tobol.

Club career
He made his Kazakhstan Premier League debut for FC Okzhetpes on 11 March 2015 in a game against FC Kaisar.

On 16 December 2019, FC Tobol announced the signing of Marochkin, before announcing his return to FC Kaisar on loan for the 2020 season on 16 February 2020.

International
He made his Kazakhstan national football team debut on 8 June 2019 in a Euro 2020 qualifier against Belgium, as a starter.

International statistics

References

External links
 
 
 

1990 births
Kazakhstani people of Russian descent
Living people
Kazakhstani footballers
Kazakhstan international footballers
Association football defenders
FC Caspiy players
FC Okzhetpes players
FC Kaisar players
FC Tobol players
Kazakhstan Premier League players